Philip Ross Watson (29 April 1881 – 20 April 1953) was a Scottish footballer who played as a wing half or centre half. His longest and most prominent spell was with Hamilton Academical, and he appeared in the 1911 Scottish Cup Final while with the club – this ended in defeat after a replay to Celtic, one of his former employers. He also spent time with Ayr, Motherwell and local team Dykehead, including several loans back when out of favour for a place in the side at his senior clubs.

His son of the same name, known as Phil, was also a footballer who made over 170 appearances each for Hamilton Academical and Blackpool and received one cap for Scotland. Another son Martin played in Scotland's second tier, mainly for Dumbarton.

References

1881 births
1953 deaths
Scottish footballers
Hamilton Academical F.C. players
Footballers from North Lanarkshire
Dykehead F.C. players
Motherwell F.C. players
Celtic F.C. players
Ayr F.C. players
Scottish Junior Football Association players
Scottish Football League players
Sportspeople from Shotts
Association football defenders
Association football wing halves